The Battle off Samar was the centermost action of the Battle of Leyte Gulf, one of the largest naval battles in history, which took place in the Philippine Sea off Samar Island, in Philippines on October 25, 1944. It was the only major action in the larger battle in which the Americans were largely unprepared. Ultimately, the Imperial Japanese Navy's First Mobile Striking Force under the command of Takeo Kurita disengaged and headed northwards, and most of the American carriers escaped with the help of rain squalls, smoke screens and intense air attack.

Admiral William Halsey Jr. was lured into taking his powerful Third Fleet after a decoy fleet of what was left of the Imperial Navy's carrier force, and took with him every ship in the area that he had the power to command. The remaining American forces in the area were three escort carrier groups of the Seventh Fleet. The Japanese plan succeeded and the center striking force achieved surprise, and could have attacked the large allied flotilla inside Leyte Gulf, although at the time of the battle the allied invasion fleet had already disembarked most of its troops.

A large Japanese force of battleships, cruisers and destroyers, led by the cruiser Atago, had been battered earlier by air attacks, the Atago was sunk in San Bernardino strait, and Kurita moved his flag to the battleship Yamato. Instead, it had turned around and encountered the northernmost of the three groups, Task Unit 77.4.3 ("Taffy 3"), commanded by Rear Admiral Clifton Sprague. Taffy 3's escorting destroyers engaged the attacking Japanese ships while the carriers retreated due south-west and then south to the cover of rain squalls and smoke screen that obscured them from further fire. Over the course of the engagement, large numbers of US aircraft made attacks on the Japanese strike force, and some Japanese aircraft vectored from Luzon attacked the retreating American task force, and one carrier was sunk by a Kamikaze attack.

The force lost two escort carriers, two destroyers, a destroyer escort and several aircraft. Over 1,000 Americans died, comparable to the combined losses of American men and ships at the Coral Sea and Midway. Three Japanese cruisers were sunk by air attack, and three others were damaged. The increasing severity of air attack convinced Kurita that he was engaging a large fleet of surface carriers, and the lack of an oiler to aid his attempt to engage in a high speed chase with the retreating enemy carriers compounded in a unanimous decision among his staff to move northwards in response to a signal requesting support for a surface battle between Ozawa's force and a purported enemy fleet between his force and the northern decoy force.

Background
The overall Japanese strategy at Leyte Gulf—a plan known as Shō-Go 1—called for Vice Admiral Jisaburō Ozawa's Northern Force to lure the American Third Fleet away from the Allied landings on Leyte, using an apparently vulnerable force of Japanese carriers as bait. The landing forces, stripped of air cover by the Third Fleet, would then be attacked from the west and south by Vice Admiral Takeo Kurita's Center Force, which would sortie from Brunei, and Vice Admiral Shoji Nishimura's Southern Force. Nishimura's flotilla included two battleships and would be followed by Vice Admiral Kiyohide Shima with three cruisers.

On the night of October 23, the American submarines  and  detected Center Force entering the Palawan Passage along the northwest coast of Palawan Island. After alerting Halsey, the submarines torpedoed and sank two cruisers, while crippling a third and forcing it to withdraw. One of the cruisers lost was Admiral Kurita's flagship, but he was rescued and transferred his flag to Yamato.

Subsequently, the carriers of the Third Fleet launched a series of air strikes against Kurita's forces in the Sibuyan Sea, damaging several vessels and sinking Musashi, initially forcing Kurita to retreat. One wave of aircraft from the Third Fleet also struck Nishimura's Southern Force, causing minor damage. At the same time, Vice Admiral Takijirō Ōnishi launched strikes from airfields on Luzon against Halsey's forces, with one bomber scoring a hit on the U.S. light carrier  that ignited explosions, causing her to be scuttled.

That same night, Nishimura's Southern Force of two battleships, a heavy cruiser, and four destroyers was to approach from the south and coordinate with Kurita's force. In the Battle of Surigao Strait, Nishimura's ships entered a deadly trap. Outmatched by the U.S. Seventh Fleet Support Force, they were devastated, running a gauntlet of torpedoes from 28 PT boats and 28 destroyers before coming under accurate radar-directed gunfire from six battleships (five of them survivors of the Pearl Harbor attack) and eight cruisers. Afterward, as Shima's force encountered what was left of Nishimura's ships, it too came under attack, but managed to withdraw. Of Nishimura's force, only one destroyer survived.

At the Battle of the Sibuyan Sea Halsey's Third Fleet savaged the Center Force, which had been detected on its way to landing forces from the north. Center Force lacked any air cover to defend against the 259 sorties from the five fleet carriers Intrepid, Essex, Lexington, Enterprise, and Franklin, and light carrier Cabot, the combination of which sank the massive battleship Musashi (sister to Yamato) with 17 bombs and 19 torpedoes. It had seemingly beaten into a retreat, but even that overwhelming force failed to stop Kurita, as most of the attacks were directed at sinking just one battleship. Besides a cruiser crippled by a torpedo, every other ship including Yamato remained battleworthy.

Halsey's Third Fleet would miss the battle and head off to the Battle off Cape Engaño where Ozawa's Northern Force consisted of one fleet carrier and three light carriers fielding a total of 108 airplanes (slightly more than the normal complement of a single large fleet carrier), two battleships, three light cruisers and nine destroyers. Halsey was convinced that the Northern Force was the main threat, just as the Japanese had planned their sacrificial diversion. Halsey took three groups of Task Force 38 (TF 38), overwhelmingly stronger than Ozawa's Northern Force, with five aircraft carriers and five light fleet carriers with more than 600 aircraft between them, six fast battleships, eight cruisers, and over 40 destroyers. Halsey easily dispatched what was later revealed to be a decoy of no serious threat.

As a result of Halsey's decision, the door was left open to Kurita. When Kurita initially withdrew, the Americans assumed that the Japanese force was retreating from the battle. Kurita eventually turned around and made his way through the San Bernardino Strait under cover of darkness, intent on destroying the American landing forces. Only the light Taffy forces attached to support the landing forces of Seventh Fleet stood in his way. They were equipped to attack ground troops and submarines under the protection of Halsey's fleet carriers, not face off against Kurita's battleships and cruisers which had already largely shrugged off combined attacks from six fleet and light carriers. It would be up to them to improvise a last ditch defense as they were thrust by Halsey's mistake into the role of a sacrificial diversion to protect their landing forces.

Forces
While the force had no aircraft carriers, Japanese warships carried small numbers of catapult-launched aircraft that could be launched, but not land aboard; for example Yamato carried seven. In this battle Japanese aircraft were used for kamikaze suicide attacks. The battleships and cruisers were fully armored against Taffy 3's  projectiles. Surface gunnery was controlled by optical sighting which fed computer-assisted fire control systems, though they were less sophisticated than the radar-controlled systems on U.S. destroyers.

In addition to guns, many of the Japanese ships carried Type 93 Long Lance torpedoes. Unknown to the Allies these torpedoes were the most advanced in the world—they had at least twice the range of Allied torpedoes, and did not produce a visible wake of bubbles; the IJN considered them to be a potentially decisive weapon. The torpedoes used oxygen instead of compressed air in their propulsion system. However, the Type 93 was far more likely to detonate due to shock—for example from a near miss—than a compressed-air torpedo, sinking or heavily damaging the ship carrying it.

Each of the three task units of the Seventh Fleet's Task Group 77.4 had six small  or larger s (CVEs) defended by destroyers and destroyer escorts. The destroyers had five  guns, the destroyer escorts had two, and the carriers only a single 5-inch gun at the stern. Most of the pilots and sailors were reservists with scant combat experience, and because of their tasking against ground troops and submarines, the carriers had been given only a few armour-piercing bombs or torpedoes against the unlikely possibility that they might encounter attack by other ships.

Lacking any ships with any larger guns that could reach beyond , Taffy 3 appeared hopelessly mismatched against Japanese gunnery, which emphasized long range and large guns. The battle revealed that the Japanese Navy's part-automated fire control was largely ineffective against maneuvering ships at long range though some ships such as Kongō hit their targets when they got closer. Although the Japanese warships opened fire with their heavier armament at maximum range and scored some hits, and misses near enough for the explosions to cause significant damage, their fire was not effective until they had closed within range of the carriers' own  armament. By contrast, the American destroyers (but not destroyer escorts) had the Mark 37 gun fire-control system that aimed automatic, accurate fire against multiple surface and air targets while maneuvering rapidly. The lack of a comparable system in Japanese ships also contributed to reports from American pilots on the ineffectiveness of the Japanese antiaircraft fire.

They returned with replacement aircraft after the battle.)

Each escort carrier was small and carried an average of about 28 planes, but had no dive bombers and only obsolescent FM-2 Wildcat fighters. That gave the 16 CVEs of the three "Taffys" a combined total of approximately 450 aircraft, equivalent to five large fleet carriers. Since their aircraft were intended for ground attack, defense against aircraft, and antisubmarine warfare, the first flights from Taffy 3 were armed only with machine guns, depth charges, and high-explosive and antipersonnel aerial bombs, that were effective against enemy troops, aircraft, submarines, and destroyers, but not very effective against armored battleships and cruisers. In later sorties from the carriers of Taffy 2, the aircraft had enough time to be rearmed with torpedoes and armor-piercing bombs that could be expected to be more effective against warships.

Battle

Kurita's force passed through San Bernardino Strait at 03:00 on October 25, 1944 and steamed southwards along the coast of Samar, hoping that Halsey had taken the bait and moved most of his fleet away as he had in fact done. Kurita had been advised that Nishimura's Southern Force had been destroyed at Surigao Strait and would not be joining his force at Leyte Gulf. However, Kurita did not receive the transmission from the Northern Force that they had successfully lured away Halsey's Third Fleet of battleships and fleet carriers. Through most of the battle, Kurita would be haunted by doubts about Halsey's actual location.

Taffy 3 comes under attack
At 06:37, Ensign William C. Brooks, flying a Grumman TBF Avenger from St. Lo, sighted a number of ships expected to be from Halsey's Third Fleet, but they appeared to be Japanese. When he was notified, Admiral Sprague was incredulous, and he demanded positive identification. Flying in for an even closer look, Brooks reported, "I can see pagoda masts. I see the biggest meatball flag on the biggest battleship I ever saw!" Yamato alone displaced as much as all units of Taffy 3 combined. Brooks had spotted the largest of the three attacking Japanese forces, consisting of four battleships, six heavy cruisers, two light cruisers, and about ten destroyers.

Armed only with depth charges in case of an encounter with enemy submarines, the aviators nevertheless carried out the first attack of the battle, dropping several depth charges which just bounced off the bow of a cruiser.

The lookouts of Taffy 3 spotted the anti-aircraft fire to the north. The Japanese came upon Taffy 3 at 06:45, achieving complete tactical surprise. At about the same time, others in Taffy 3 had picked up targets from surface radar and Japanese radio traffic. Lacking the Americans' gunnery radars and Ford Mark I Fire Control Computer, which provided co-ordinated automatic firing solutions as long as the gun director was pointed at the target, Japanese fire control relied on a mechanical calculator for ballistics and another for own and target course and speed, fed by optical rangefinders. Color-coded dye loads were used in the battleships' armor-piercing shells so that the spotters of each ship could identify its own fall of shot, a common practice for the capital ships of many navies. The Americans, unfamiliar with battleship combat, were soon astonished by the spectacle of colorful geysers as the first volleys of shellfire found their range. Nagato used a brilliant pink; Haruna used a greenish-yellow variously described as green or yellow by the Americans; and Kongō used a blood-red dye which could appear red, purple, or even blue in some circumstances. Yamato used no dye loads, so her shell splashes appeared white.

Not finding the silhouettes of the tiny escort carriers in his identification manuals, Kurita mistook them for large fleet carriers and assumed that he had a task group of the Third Fleet under his guns. His first priority was to eliminate the carrier threat, ordering a "General Attack": rather than a carefully orchestrated effort, each division in his task force was to attack separately. The Japanese had just changed to a circular anti-aircraft formation, and the order caused some confusion, allowing Sprague to lead the Japanese into a stern chase, which restricted the Japanese to using only their forward guns, and restricted their anti-aircraft gunnery. Sprague's ships would not lose as much of their firepower in a stern chase, as their stern chase weapons were more numerous than their forward guns, and his carriers would still be able to operate aircraft.

Run to the east
At 06:50 Admiral Sprague ordered a formation course change to 090, directed his carriers to turn to launch their aircraft and then withdraw towards a squall to the east, hoping that bad visibility would reduce the accuracy of Japanese gunfire. He ordered his escorts to the rear of the formation to generate smoke to mask the retreating carriers and ordered the carriers to take evasive action, "chasing salvos" to throw off their enemy's aim, and then launched all available FM-2 Wildcat fighter planes and TBM Avenger torpedo bombers with whatever armament they were already loaded with. Some had rockets, machine guns, depth charges, or nothing at all. Very few carried anti-ship bombs or aerial torpedoes which would have enabled aircraft to sink heavy armored warships. The Wildcats were deemed a better fit on such small aircraft carriers instead of the faster and heavier Grumman F6F Hellcats that were flown from the larger U.S. Navy carriers. Their pilots were ordered "to attack the Japanese task force and proceed to Tacloban airstrip, Leyte, to rearm and refuel". Many of the planes continued to make "dry runs" after expending their ammunition and ordnance to distract the enemy.  At about 07:20 the formation entered the squall, and the Japanese fire slackened markedly as they did not have gunnery radar that could penetrate the rain and smoke.

Kurita meanwhile was already experiencing the consequences of ordering a General Attack, as his Fifth Cruiser and Tenth Destroyer Divisions cut across the course of the Third Battleship Division in their haste to close with the American carriers, forcing the battleship Kongō to turn north out of formation; Kongō acted independently for the remainder of the battle. Concerned that his destroyers would burn too much fuel in a stern chase of what he presumed were fast carriers while obstructing his battleships' line of fire, Kurita ordered his destroyers to the rear of his formation at 07:10, a decision which had immediate consequences, as the Tenth Destroyer Squadron was forced to turn away just as they were gaining on the right flank of the American formation. For the Second Destroyer Squadron, the consequences were more significant if less immediate: ordered to fall in behind Third Battleship Division, Yahagi and her accompanying destroyers steamed north from their position on the south side of Kurita's formation seeking division flagship Kongō, leaving no Japanese units in position to intercept the American carriers when they turned back south at 07:30.  Despite his General Attack order, Kurita continued to dictate fleet course changes throughout the battle.

American destroyer and destroyer escort counterattack

Three destroyers and four smaller destroyer escorts had been tasked to protect the escort carriers from aircraft and submarines. The three s—affectionately nicknamed "tin cans" because they lacked armor—were fast enough to keep up with a fast carrier task force. Each had five single-mounted  guns and several light antiaircraft guns, none of which were effective against armored warships. Only their ten  Mark-15 torpedoes—housed in two swiveling five-tube launchers amidships—posed a serious threat to battleships and cruisers.

An advantage the American destroyers had was the radar-controlled Mark 37 Gun Fire Control System, which provided coordinated automatic firing of their  guns as long as the gun director was pointing at the target. A dual-purpose system, the Mark 37's gunfire radar and antiaircraft capabilities allowed the destroyers' guns to remain on target despite poor visibility and their own radical evasive maneuvering. The Japanese reliance on optical range finders aided by color-coded dye loads in each shell and mechanical calculators made it difficult for them to identify their targets through the rain and smoke and limited their ability to maneuver while firing. The different colored splashes the Japanese shells made as they hit the water by the American ships after a near miss prompted one American sailor to quip "They're shooting at us in Technicolor!"

The four s were smaller and slower because they had been designed to protect slow freighter convoys against submarines. They were armed with two  guns without automatic fire control, and three torpedoes, though their crews rarely trained for torpedo attacks. In this battle they would be launched against a fleet led by the largest battleship in history, though it was the ships' ability to generate dense, heavy smoke from their funnels and chemical smoke generators which would most influence the course of the battle.

After laying down smoke to hide the carriers from Japanese gunners, they were soon making desperate torpedo runs, using their smoke for concealment. The ship profiles and aggressiveness caused the Japanese to think the destroyers were cruisers, and the destroyer escorts were full-sized destroyers. Their lack of armor allowed armor-piercing rounds to pass right through without exploding, until the Japanese gunners switched to high-explosive (HE) shells, which caused much more damage. Their speed and agility enabled some ships to dodge shellfire completely before launching torpedoes. Effective damage control and redundancy in propulsion and power systems kept them running and fighting even after they had absorbed dozens of hits before they sank, although the decks would be littered with the dead and the seriously wounded. Destroyers from Taffy 2 to the south also found themselves under shellfire, but as they were spotted by Gambier Bay, which had signaled for their assistance, they were ordered back to protect their own carriers.

USS Johnston
At 07:00, Commander Ernest E. Evans of the destroyer , responded to incoming shell fire bracketing carriers of the group he was escorting by laying down a protective smokescreen and zigzagging. The Japanese targeted Johnston and soon shell splashes were bracketing the destroyer. In response and without consulting with his commanders, Evans ordered Johnston to "flank speed, full left rudder"; Johnston, still making smoke and zigzagging, accelerated at maximum speed towards the Japanese.

At 07:15, Hagen concentrated fire on the leading cruiser squadron's flagship, the heavy cruiser Kumano.

At 07:16, Sprague ordered Commander William Dow Thomas aboard Hoel, in charge of the small destroyer screen, to attack. Struggling to form an attack formation, the three small ships Hoel, Heermann and Samuel B. Roberts began a long sprint to get into firing position for their torpedoes.

Johnston pressed its attack, firing more than two hundred shells as it followed an evasive course through moderate swells, making it a difficult target. Johnston closed to within maximum torpedo range, and at  she fired a full salvo of ten torpedoes. At 07:24, two or three struck, blowing the bow off Kumano. Minutes later, at 07:33, four torpedoes narrowly missed Kongō.  (Morison asserts that Kongō was forced to turn away north to avoid these torpedoes, but this is not reflected in Kongōs own action report.  It is unclear whether these torpedoes were fired by Johnston or Hoel.) The heavy cruiser Suzuya, suffering damage from air attacks, was also taken out of the fight, as she stopped to assist Kumano. The effect of Johnstons attack was to generate confusion in the minds of the Japanese commanders, who thought they were being engaged by American cruisers. Evans then reversed course and, under cover of his smokescreen, opened the range between his ship and the enemy.

The ship was mangled badly, with dead and dying sailors strewn across her bloody decks. Yamato reported sinking a "cruiser" (the Japanese consistently overestimated the size of the US ships engaged) with a main battery salvo at 07:27. Destroyer Kishinami, which was also firing at Johnston at the time, reported "The Yamato sank one enemy cruiser" at 07:28.

However, Johnston was not sunk. Already depleted before the battle, her remaining store of oil did not fuel a catastrophic explosion. The ship found sanctuary in rain squalls, where the crew had time to repair damage, restoring power to two of the three aft gun mounts. Johnstons search radar was destroyed, toppled to the deck in a tangled mess. Also damaged, the fire control radar was quickly returned to service. Only a few minutes were required to bring Johnstons main battery and radar online; from its position in the rain, around 07:35 Johnston fired several dozen rounds at the lead Japanese destroyer  distant. Neither target could be observed visually, and thus were not positively identified; Johnstons presumed "cruiser" was most likely the battleship Haruna.

At 07:37, Commodore Thomas ordered a torpedo attack via voice radio. Johnston and Heermann acknowledged. As Johnston continued its course away from the Japanese, it came upon the charging screening force, led by the damaged Hoel. Evans had Johnston rejoin the attack, to provide gun support to Thomas' small squadron on their torpedo run.

During the battle, Evans engaged in several duels with much larger Japanese opponents. At 08:20, emerging through smoke and rain squalls, Johnston was confronted by a 36,600-ton Kongō-class battleship (probably Haruna, which reported engaging a US destroyer with her secondary battery around this time.) Johnston fired at least 40 rounds, with over 15 hits on the battleship's superstructure observed. Johnston reversed course and disappeared in the smoke, avoiding Harunas  return fire. At 08:26 and again at 08:34, Thomas requested an attack on the heavy cruisers to the east of the carriers.

At 08:40, a more pressing target appeared astern: seven Japanese destroyers in two columns, closing to attack the carriers. Reversing course to intercept, Evans attempted to pass in front of the formation, crossing the "T" (a classic naval maneuver to limit the enemy ships' firepower). Evans ordered Johnstons guns to fire on the Japanese destroyers, who returned fire striking Johnston several times. Perhaps seeing his disadvantage, the commander of the lead destroyer turned away to the west. Amazingly, the entire squadron turned west to avoid Johnstons fire. Several torpedoes were detonated by strafing aircraft or defensive fire from the carriers, and the rest failed to strike a target.

The Japanese and the American ships were now intertwined in a confused jumble. The heavy smoke had made the visibility so poor by 08:40 Johnston nearly collided with Heerman while it crossed the formation to engage the Japanese destroyers, forcing Samuel B. Roberts to evade them both. Gambier Bay and Hoel were sinking. Finding targets was not difficult. After 09:00, with Hoel and Samuel B. Roberts out of the fight, the crippled Johnston was an easy target. She exchanged fire with four cruisers and numerous destroyers.

Johnston continued to take hits from the Japanese, which knocked out the number one gun mount, killing many men. By 09:20, forced from the bridge by exploding ammunition, Evans commanded the ship from the stern by shouting orders down to men manually operating the rudder. Shellfire knocked out the remaining engine, leaving Johnston dead in the water at 09:40. Her attackers concentrated their fire on her rather than the fleeing carriers. Johnston was hit so many times that one survivor recalled "they couldn't patch holes fast enough to keep her afloat."

At 09:45, Evans finally gave the order to abandon ship. Johnston sank 25 minutes later with 186 of her crew. Evans abandoned ship with his crew, but was never seen again. He was posthumously awarded the Medal of Honor. As the Japanese destroyer  cruised slowly nearby, Robert Billie and several other crewmen saw her captain salute the sinking Johnston.

USS Samuel B. Roberts

Although destroyer escorts were conceived as inexpensive small ships that could protect slow cargo convoys against submarines, they retained a basic anti-ship capability with torpedoes and  guns.  distinguished herself in this battle as the "destroyer escort that fought like a battleship" combating armored cruisers (which were designed to withstand 5-inch gunfire). Around 07:40, Lieutenant Commander Robert W. Copeland maneuvered his small ship to evade the charging Heermann; watching that destroyer approach the enemy, Copeland realized his own ship's heading and location put it in a textbook position to launch a torpedo attack at the leading heavy cruiser. Over his ship's 1MC public-address circuit, he told his crew "This will be a fight against overwhelming odds from which survival cannot be expected. We will do what damage we can." Without orders and indeed against orders, he set course at full speed to follow Heermann in to attack the cruisers.

Under the cover of the smokescreen from the destroyers, Roberts escaped detection. A stray shell, probably intended for one of the nearby destroyers, hit Robertss mast which fell and jammed the torpedo mount at 08:00. Quickly reversing course, Roberts disappeared into the smoke. A lookout reported at least one torpedo hit, but in reality the Chōkai was not hit by a torpedo.

By 08:10, Roberts was nearing the carrier formation. Through the smoke and rain, the heavy cruiser Chikuma appeared, firing broadsides at the carriers. Copeland changed course to attack and told his gun captain, "Mr Burton, you may open fire." Roberts and Chikuma began to trade broadsides. Chikuma now divided her fire between the carriers and Roberts. Hampered by the closing range and slow rate of fire, Chikuma fired with difficulty at her small, fast opponent. Roberts did not share Chikumas problem of slow rate of fire. However, unknown to the crew of Roberts, shortly after Roberts engaged Chikuma, Heermann also aimed her guns at the cruiser.

However, Chikuma was not alone, and soon, the Japanese fleet's multicolored salvos were bracketing Roberts, indicating that she was under fire from Yamato, Nagato, and Haruna. In a desperate bid to avoid approaching shells, Copeland ordered full back, causing the salvo to miss. Now, however, his small ship was an easy target, and at 08:51, cruiser shells found their mark, damaging one of her boilers. At , Roberts began to suffer hits regularly. Credit is given to Kongō for striking the final decisive blows at 09:00, which knocked out her remaining engine. Dead in the water and sinking, Robertss part in the battle was over.

Gunner's Mate Paul H. Carr was in charge of the aft  gun mount, which had fired nearly all of its 325 stored rounds in 35 minutes before a breech explosion caused by the gun's barrel overheating. Carr was found dying at his station, begging for help loading the last round he was holding into the breech. He was awarded a Silver Star, and the guided-missile frigate  was later named for him.

While they missed, this helped slow the Japanese chase. Dennis was struck by a pair of cruiser shells, and John C. Butler ceased fire after expending her ammunition an hour into the engagement.

USS Hoel
The fast destroyer , captained by Commander Leon S. Kintberger, was the flagship of the small destroyer and destroyer escort screen of Taffy 3. As splashes from Japanese shells began bracketing the ships of the task group, Hoel started zig-zagging and laying smoke to help defend the now fleeing CVEs.

Admiral Sprague then ordered Thomas to attack the Japanese with torpedoes. From his position on the damaged Hoel, he formed up the three destroyers of his command as best he could and at 07:40 ordered "Line up and let's go." Through rain showers and smoke, Hoel zig-zagged toward the Japanese fleet, followed by Heermann and Samuel B. Roberts. Lurking in the rain, Johnston was targeting unsuspecting Japanese cruisers with her radar.

Kintberger now had to choose a target quickly as the distance closed rapidly. In the Combat Information Center, Executive Officer Fred Green quickly suggested a course that would put Hoel in a position to attack the leading "battleship", either Kongō or possibly the heavy cruiser Haguro. Without hesitation, Kintberger ordered Hoel in. The course took the ship into the middle of the charging Center Force.

Gunnery Officer Lt. Bill Sanders directed Hoels main battery of five  guns in a rapid-fire barrage, drawing the attention of a substantial portion of the Japanese fleet. Soon shells of all calibers were straddling the destroyer.

Moments after Hoel loosed her first half salvo, a devastating series of multi-caliber shells struck Hoel in rapid succession, disabling all the primary and secondary battery weapons aft of the second stack, stopping her port engine and depriving her of her Mark-37 fire control director, FD radar, and bridge steering control. His ship slowing to 17 knots under hand steering, Kintberger realized he would have to fire his remaining torpedoes quickly while he still could.

Heading southwest after his initial torpedo attack, Commander Kintberger turned west and launched his second torpedo salvo at a "Heavy Cruiser" (probably Yamato or Haruna, both sides having difficulty with target identification in the poor visibility) at approximately 07:50. This time, Hoels crew were rewarded by what appeared to be the sight of large columns of water alongside their target. The torpedo hits could not be confirmed, however. The water spouts were probably near misses by bombs. Japanese action reports reveal that Hoels target was probably Yamato, which turned hard to port to evade a torpedo salvo at 07:54 and was forced to run north until the torpedoes ran out of fuel, taking Kurita out of the battle and causing him to lose track of his forces.

Hoel was now crippled and surrounded by the enemy, with her speed reduced to 17 knots. Within a few minutes, steerage had been restored from the aft steering room. Kintberger ordered a course south towards Taffy 3. In the process of fishtailing and zig-zagging, she fired at the closest enemy ships with her two remaining guns. Finally at roughly 08:30, after withstanding over 40 hits from  guns, an  shell disabled her remaining engine. With her engine room underwater and No. 1 magazine ablaze, the ship began listing to port, settling by the stern. The order to abandon ship was given at 08:40, and many of her surviving crew swam away from the ship.

A Japanese cruiser and several destroyers closed to within , giving the two forward gun crews, under Gun Captain Chester Fay, a large, close target. For about ten minutes, they traded salvos with the Tone-class cruiser.

Hoel was the first of Taffy 3's ships to sink, and suffered the heaviest proportional losses: only 86 of her complement survived; 253 officers and men died with their ship. Commander Kintberger, who would live to retire a rear admiral, described the courageous devotion to duty of the men of Hoel in a seaman's epitaph: "Fully cognizant of the inevitable result of engaging such vastly superior forces, these men performed their assigned duties coolly and efficiently until their ship was shot from under them."

USS Heermann
—captained by Commander Amos T. Hathaway—was on the disengaged side of the carriers at the start of the fight when at 07:37 he received an order from Commodore Thomas to take the lead position in a column of "small boys" to attack the approaching enemy fleet.

At 07:50, Heermann engaged the heavy cruiser Haguro with her  guns, while hurriedly preparing a half-salvo torpedo attack. In the confusion of battle, the torpedoman on the second torpedo mount mistakenly fired two extra torpedoes at the same time as the number one mount before he was stopped by the mount captain. After firing seven torpedoes, Heermann changed course to engage a column of three battleships that had commenced firing upon her.

Hathaway may now have been responsible for causing a series of events that may have had a decisive influence on the outcome of the battle. He directed  gunfire on the battleship Haruna, the column's leader. Then, he quickly closed to a mere  and fired his last three torpedoes. Haruna evaded all of them, but historian Samuel Eliot Morison asserts that Yamato was bracketed between two of Heermanns torpedoes on parallel courses, and for 10 minutes was forced to head north away from the action, while Lundgren, based on a comparison of both Japanese and American sources, asserts that the torpedoes came from Hoels second salvo fired at 07:53. In either case, Kurita and his most powerful ship were temporarily out of the action.

At 08:03, believing that one of the torpedoes had hit the battleship, Hathaway set course for the carrier formation, zigzagging and under the cover of smoke. Still undamaged, Heermann was able to fire through the smoke and rain at nearby targets. Now under continuous fire, Heermann began an unequal duel with Nagato, whose salvos were beginning to land uncomfortably close. At one point between 08:08 and 08:25, Heermann was within throwing distance of a Japanese destroyer for several minutes, before being separated by the smoke. During this time, neither ship fired on the other, both having higher-priority targets.

At 08:26, Commander Thomas requested covering fire on the cruisers firing on the CVEs from the east. Hathaway responded but first had to pass through the formation of carriers and escorts. This task proved hazardous. Traveling at flank speed, Heermann again had two near misses, this time with Fanshaw Bay and Johnston.

Finally on course for the enemy cruisers, Heermann came upon the heavily damaged Gambier Bay which was being pummeled at point-blank range. At , Heermann engaged Chikuma as her guns cleared Gambier Bay. During this phase of the battle, Heermann came under fire from the bulk of the Japanese fleet. Colored splashes of red, yellow, and green indicated that she was being targeted by Kongō and Haruna. Many uncolored splashes were also observed, likely from the line of heavy cruisers being led by Chikuma. At 08:45, a hit on Heermanns wheelhouse killed three men outright and fatally wounded another.  A series of  shell hits flooded the forward part of the destroyer, pulling her bow down so far that her anchors were dragging in the water, and one of her guns was knocked out.

At 08:50, aircraft from VC-10 approached the scene and were vectored via VHF by Taffy 3 to the cruisers to the east. By 08:53, Chikuma and the rest of the four heavy cruisers were under heavy air attack. At 0902, under the combined effort of Heermann, Roberts, and the bombs, torpedoes, and strafing from the carrier-based planes, during this time Chikuma was immobilized by an aerial bomb, and was later scuttled when the center force moved north.

At 09:07, the heavy cruiser Tone exchanged fire with Heermann until she too turned away at 09:10. By 09:17, Sprague ordered Hathaway to lay smoke on the port quarter of the CVEs, and by 09:30, the group had reformed in its normal formation and was headed southward.

Due to a multitude of factors, including the fear that they were engaging a large surface force and a cryptic message from Ozawa's force signaling for a battle north, Kurita gave a "cease action" order at 09:00, with instructions to rendezvous north.  Thus, unexpectedly, the Japanese began to disengage and turned away.

Though extensively damaged, Heermann was the only destroyer from the screen to survive.

Run to the south

Temporarily safe within the rain squall, Admiral Sprague had a difficult decision to make.  The easterly course was drawing the enemy too close to San Bernardino Strait and away from any help that might come from Admiral Oldendorf's forces to the south, and Kurita was about to gain the windward side of his formation, which would render his smoke less effective. Consequently, at 07:30 Sprague ordered a course change, first to the southeast and then to the south, and ordered his escorts to make their torpedo attack to cover the carrier's emergence from the storm. That was a very risky decision for Sprague because it gave Kurita a chance to cut across the diameter of Sprague's arc and cut him off.

However, Kurita missed the chance and his forces followed Taffy 3 around the circle, his earlier decision to send his destroyers to the rear having removed them from a position that they could have intercepted or prevented the American formation's turn. The six carriers dodged in and out of rain squalls, occasionally turning into the wind to launch the few planes they had left.

After one hour, the Japanese had closed the chase to within  of the carriers. That the carriers had managed to evade destruction reinforced the Japanese belief that they were attacking fast fleet carriers. The heavy clouds of black and white smoke generated by the Americans were now making target observation extremely difficult. At 08:00, Sprague ordered the carriers to "open fire with pea-shooters when the range is clear." The stern chase was also advantageous for the sole anti-ship armament of small carriers was a single manually controlled stern-mounted  gun as a stinger, though they were loaded with anti-aircraft shells.  As anti-aircraft gunners observed helplessly, an officer cheered them by exclaiming, "Just wait a little longer, boys, we're suckering them into 40-mm range."

Carriers under attack
During the run to the east the ships had been battered by near-misses. At 08:05, Kalinin Bay was struck by an  shell and the carriers started taking direct hits. However, the Japanese ships were firing armor-piercing (AP) shells, which often carried right through the unarmored escort carriers without detonating. Though CVEs were popularly known as "Combustible Vulnerable Expendable," they would ultimately prove durable in first dodging and then absorbing heavy shell fire and in downing attacking kamikaze planes.

USS White Plains
Yamatos third salvo was a close straddle landing at 07:04. One shell from this salvo exploded beneath the turn of White Plains port bilge near frame 142, close to her aft (starboard) engine room. While the ship was not struck directly, the mining effect of the under-keel explosion severely damaged her hull, deranged her starboard machinery, and tripped all of the circuit breakers in her electrical network. Prompt and effective damage control restored power and communications within three minutes and she was able to remain in formation by overspeeding her port engine to compensate. The gout of black smoke resulting from the shock of the explosion convinced Yamato (and Nagato, which was also firing her main battery at White Plains at the time) that they had scored a direct hit and they shifted fire to other targets. The turn to the south put White Plains in the lead of the formation and she escaped any further hits from Japanese fire.

During the surface phase of the action, White Plainss  gun crew claimed six hits on heavy cruiser , although these are not verified by Japanese officers. shortly afterwards hit by a bomb.

USS Gambier Bay
As Japanese gunners concentrated on the closest target,  effectively diverted attention from the other fleeing carriers. At 08:10, Chikuma closed to within  and finally landed hits on the flight deck of Gambier Bay, which was the most exposed. Subsequent hits and near-misses, as the Japanese switched to high-explosive shells, first caused Gambier Bay to lose speed, and she was soon dead in the water. Three cruisers closed to point-blank range, as destroyers such as Johnston were unsuccessful in drawing fire away from the doomed carrier. Fires raged through the riddled escort carrier. She capsized at 09:07 and disappeared beneath the waves at 09:11. 4 Grumman TBM Avenger torpedo bombers went down with Gambier Bay. 130 crewmen were killed. The majority of her nearly 800 survivors were rescued two days later by landing and patrol craft dispatched from Leyte Gulf. Gambier Bay was the only U.S. carrier sunk by naval gunfire in World War II.

USS St. Lo

Straddled several times during the run to the east,  escaped serious damage during the surface phase of the action. By 07:38 the Japanese cruisers approaching from St. Los port quarter had closed to within . St. Lo responded to their salvos with rapid fire from her single  gun, claiming three hits on a Tone-class cruiser. At 10:00, she launched an Avenger armed with a torpedo to join the attack launched by Kitkun Bay at 10:13. At 10:51 Lt. Yukio Seki, leader of the Shikishima squadron of the Special Attack Unit, crashed his A6M Zero into her flight deck from astern in the first organized kamikaze attack. The resulting explosions and fires within her hangar forced Captain Francis McKenna to order abandon ship at 11:00. St. Lo capsized and sank at 11:25 with the loss of 114 men. Six Grumman FM-2 Wildcat fighters and five Grumman TBM Avenger torpedo bombers went down with St. Lo.

USS Kalinin Bay
As the trailing ship in the escort carrier van after the turn to the south,  came under intense enemy fire. Though partially protected by smoke, a timely rain squall, and counterattacks by the screening destroyers and destroyer escorts, she took the first of fifteen direct hits at 07:50. Fired from an enemy battleship, the large-caliber shell ( or ) struck the starboard side of the hangar deck just aft of the forward elevator.

By 08:00 the Japanese cruisers off her port quarter (Tone and Haguro) had closed to within . Kalinin Bay responded to their straddling salvos with her  gun. Three  armor-piercing projectiles struck her within minutes.

At 08:30, five Japanese destroyers steamed over the horizon off her starboard quarter. As screening ships engaged the cruisers and laid down concealing smoke, Kalinin Bay shifted her fire, and for the next hour traded shots with Destroyer Squadron 10. No destroyer hit Kalinin Bay, but she took ten more  hits from the now obscured cruisers. One shell passed through the flight deck and into the communications area and destroyed all the radar and radio equipment. Most of the hits occurred after 08:45 when Tone and Haguro had closed to within .

At 09:15, an Avenger from St. Lo—piloted by Lieutenant (j.g.) Waldrop—strafed and exploded two torpedoes in Kalinin Bays wake about  astern of her. A shell from the latter's  gun deflected a third from a collision course with her stern. At about 09:30, as the Japanese ships fired parting salvos and reversed course northward, Kalinin Bay scored a direct hit amidships on a retreating destroyer. Five minutes later, she ceased fire and retired southward with the other survivors of Taffy 3.

Around 10:50, the task unit came under a concentrated air attack. During the 40-minute battle, the first attack from a kamikaze unit in World War II, all escort carriers but Fanshaw Bay were damaged. Four diving planes attacked Kalinin Bay from astern and the starboard quarter. Two were shot down when close, but the third crashed into the port side of the flight deck, damaging it severely, and the fourth destroyed the aft port stack. Kalinin Bay suffered extensive structural damage during the morning's intense action, and sixty casualties including five dead. Twelve direct hits and two large-caliber near misses were confirmed. The two near-misses exploded under her counter, and were the severest threats to the ship's survival.

USS Kitkun Bay
Straddled several times early in the surface action during the run to the east as she was at the rear of the formation alongside White Plains,  was towards the front of the formation after the turn to the south and escaped serious damage. At 10:13 she launched five Avengers (four armed with torpedoes, one with bombs) to attack the retreating Japanese. The five (along with one from St. Lo) attacked Yamato at 10:35 without result. Attacked by a kamikaze at 11:08, she was successfully defended by her own and Fanshaw Bays anti-aircraft batteries. She was the only one of Sprague's carriers to escape undamaged.

USS Fanshaw Bay
Targeted by Kongō and Haruna early in the action (red, yellow and blue shell splashes) Sprague's flagship  escaped serious damage during the run to the east and was on the far side of the formation across from Gambier Bay during the run to the south. During the later kamikaze attacks, the Fanshaw Bay took a near-miss kamikaze close aboard, helped shoot down a plane just about to crash into Kitkun Bay, and landed planes from her sunk or damaged sisters. Fanshaw Bay suffered four dead and four wounded.

Battleship Yamato
 engaged enemy surface forces for the first and only time at Samar, entering the battle two meters down by the bow and limited to 26 knots due to 3,000 tons of flooding caused by three armor-piercing bombs during the Battle of the Sibuyan Sea. The resulting gout of smoke from the stricken carrier obscured the target and convinced Yamato she was destroyed, so they ceased fire at 07:09. At 07:51, she turned her secondary battery on USS Raymond at a range of  before steering hard to port to avoid a torpedo salvo from the charging USS Hoel at 07:54. At 07:55, Yamato opened fire on Hoel with her  anti-aircraft guns and was struck by an American  shell in return. Hemmed in by Haruna to starboard and her destroyers to port Yamato was forced to run due north away from the battle until the torpedoes ran out of fuel, finally turning back at 08:12.

At 08:23 Yamatos F1M2 "Pete" floatplane reported a primary battery hit on Gambier Bay though this hit was also claimed by Kongō. Gambier Bays own records report a damaging near miss from a battleship caliber shell around this time. At 08:34 Yamato trained her secondary batteries on another "light cruiser", probably USS Hoel, which was observed sinking at 08:40. At 08:45 Yamato sighted three of the American carriers, US smoke screens preventing her from seeing the entire US formation. Between 09:06 and 09:17 Yamato received multiple strafing and torpedo attacks from US aircraft, claiming one US aircraft shot down at 09:15. Fighter pilot Lieutenant Richard W. Roby reportedly attacked destroyers before raking the decks and then bridge of Yamato with his  machine guns, further discouraging her. However, US reports that Yamato closed to within  of the American ships before she was attacked by American aircraft are not supported by Yamatos own action report. At 09:11, Kurita ordered his ships to regroup to the north and at 09:22 Yamato slowed to 20 knots and came round to course 040, finally setting course 000 (due north) at 09:25. Kurita reported that his force had sunk two carriers, two cruisers, and some destroyers, apparently assuming that Yamato had indeed sunk White Plains with her first four salvoes.  Kurita's forces had actually sunk one carrier, two destroyers, and one destroyer escort, and Yamatos guns likely contributed to the sinking of three out of four, with claimed hits (some unconfirmed or disputed) on all except Samuel B. Roberts.

Japanese losses 
's detailed action report states that Chōkais immobilizing damage resulted from a bomb hit at 08:51, she was later scuttled by torpedoes from Japanese destroyers as she could not join the retreat, confirmed by other officers of the center force Contrary to Hornfischer's claim, Chokai was not sunk by catastrophic secondary explosions from direct 5" hits to her torpedoes. Diving expeditions conducted on the ship's wreckage revealed her torpedoes to be still intact.

Kumano's bow was blown off by a torpedo, and she retired towards the San Bernardino Strait, where she suffered further, minor, damage from an aerial attack.

Cruiser  engaged the U.S. escort carriers, helping to sink Gambier Bay, but came under attack from Heermann. Chikuma inflicted severe damage on Heermann, but was soon attacked in the anvil approach by four TBM Avenger torpedo-bombers. She was hit portside amidships by two torpedoes and her engine rooms flooded. Cady was later awarded the Navy Cross for his action.

While withdrawing from the battle area, Nowaki was herself sunk, with the loss of all but one of Chikumas surviving crewmen, it is unknown how the Nowaki was lost and is still a topic of research today.

The heavy cruiser , which had also engaged the carriers, received fatal damage from the air, although not hit directly. Early in the battle, she was attacked by ten Avengers from Taffy 3. A near-miss close astern to port by an HE bomb from one of the TBMs carried away one of Suzuyas propellers, reducing her maximum speed to 20 knots. At 10:50, she was attacked by 30 more carrier aircraft. Another near miss by a bomb, this time starboard amidships, detonated a Long Lance torpedo loaded in one of her starboard tube mounts. The fires started by the explosion soon propagated to other torpedoes nearby and beyond, the subsequent explosions damaging one of the boilers and the starboard engine rooms. Abandon ship was ordered at 11:50, none too soon, as the fires set off the remaining torpedoes and her main magazines ten minutes later. Suzuya rolled over and sank at 13:22. 401 officers and crew were rescued by destroyer , followed by further rescues by American ships.

Kurita withdraws
Although Kurita's battleships had not been seriously damaged, the air and destroyer attacks had broken up his formations, and he had lost tactical control. His flagship Yamato had been forced to turn north in order to avoid torpedoes, causing him to lose contact with much of his task force. The determined, concentrated sea and air attack from Taffy 3 had already sunk or crippled the heavy cruisers Chōkai, Kumano, and Chikuma, which seemed to confirm to the Japanese that they were engaging major fleet units rather than escort carriers and destroyers. Kurita was at first not aware that Halsey had already taken the bait and that his battleships and carriers were far out of range. The ferocity of the renewed air attacks further contributed to his confusion and reinforced his suspicion that Halsey's aircraft carriers were nearby. Signals from Ozawa eventually convinced Kurita that he was not currently engaged with the entirety of Third fleet, and that the remaining elements of Halsey's forces might close in and destroy him if he lingered too long in the area.

Finally, Kurita received word that the Southern Force that he was to meet had been destroyed the previous night. Calculating that the fight was not worth further losses and believing he had already sunk or damaged several American carriers, Kurita broke off the engagement at 09:20 with the order: "all ships, my course north, speed 20." He set a course for Leyte Gulf but became distracted by reports of another American carrier group to the north. Preferring to expend his ships against capital ships, rather than transports, he turned north after the non-existent enemy fleet and ultimately withdrew back through the San Bernardino Strait.

As he retreated north and then west through the San Bernardino Strait, the smaller and heavily damaged American force continued to press the battle. While watching the Japanese retreat, Admiral Sprague heard a nearby sailor exclaim, "Damn it, boys, they're getting away!"

Seventh Fleet's calls for help
Shortly after 08:00, desperate messages calling for assistance began to come in from Seventh Fleet. One from Vice Admiral Thomas C. Kinkaid, sent in plain language, read, "My situation is critical. Fast battleships and support by airstrikes may be able to keep enemy from destroying CVEs and entering Leyte."

At 08:22, Kinkaid radioed, "Fast Battleships are Urgently Needed Immediately at Leyte Gulf".

At 09:05, Kinkaid radioed, "Need Fast Battleships and Air Support".

At 09:07, Kinkaid broadcast what his mismatched fleet was up against: "4 Battleships, 8 Cruisers Attack Our Escort Carriers".

 away at Pearl Harbor, Admiral Chester W. Nimitz had monitored the desperate calls from Taffy 3, and sent Halsey a terse message: "Where is TF 34?". To complicate decryption, communications officers were to add a nonsense phrase at both ends of a message, in this case, "Turkey trots to water" and suffixed with "The world wonders." The receiving radioman repeated the "where is" section of this message and his staff failed to remove the trailing phrase "the world wonders." A simple query by a distant supervisor had, through the random actions of three sailors, become a stinging rebuke.

Halsey was infuriated since he did not recognize the final phrase as padding, possibly chosen for the 90th anniversary of the Charge of the Light Brigade. He threw his hat to the deck and began to curse.

Halsey sent Task Group 38.1 (TG 38.1), commanded by Vice Admiral John S. McCain, to assist. Halsey recalled that he did not receive the vital message from Kinkaid until around 10:00 and later claimed that he had known that Kinkaid was in trouble but had not dreamed of the seriousness of the crisis. McCain, by contrast, had monitored Sprague's messages and turned TG 38.1 to aid Sprague even before Halsey's orders arrived (after prodding from Nimitz), putting Halsey's defense in question.

At 10:05, Kinkaid asked, "Who is guarding the San Bernardino Strait?"

McCain raced toward the battle and briefly turned into the wind to recover returning planes. Although the attack did little damage, it strengthened Kurita's decision to retire.

At 11:15, more than two hours after the first distress messages had been received by his flagship, Halsey ordered TF 34 to turn around and head south to pursue Kurita, but the Japanese forces had already escaped.

Just hours after his perceived chastisement by Nimitz, Halsey's forces destroyed all four enemy aircraft carriers he had pursued. However, despite the complete absence of Third Fleet against the main Japanese force, the desperate efforts of Taffy 3 and assisting task forces had driven back the Japanese. A relieved Halsey sent the following message to Nimitz, Kinkaid and General Douglas MacArthur at 12:26: "It can be announced with assurance that the Japanese Navy has been beaten, routed and broken by the Third and Seventh Fleets."

Survivors' ordeal
Partly as a result of disastrous communication errors within Seventh Fleet and a reluctance to expose search ships to submarine attack, a very large number of survivors from Taffy 3, including those from Gambier Bay, Hoel, Johnston, and Roberts, were not rescued until October 27, after two days adrift. A plane had spotted the survivors, but the location radioed back was incorrect. By then, many had died as a result of exposure, thirst and shark attacks. Finally, when a Landing Craft Infantry of Task Group 78.12 arrived, its captain used what is almost a standard method of distinguishing friend from foe, asking a topical question about a national sport, as one survivor, Jack Yusen, relates:

We saw this ship come up, it was circling around us, and a guy was standing up on the bridge with a megaphone. And he called out 'Who are you? Who are you?' and we all yelled out 'Samuel B. Roberts!' He's still circling, so now we're cursing at him. He came back and yelled 'Who won the World Series?' and we all yelled 'St. Louis Cardinals!' And then we could hear the engines stop, and cargo nets were thrown over the side. That's how we were rescued.

Aftermath
The Japanese had succeeded in luring Halsey's Third Fleet away from its role of covering the invasion fleet, but the remaining light forces proved to be a very considerable obstacle. The force that Halsey had unwittingly left behind carried about 450 aircraft, comparable to the forces of five fleet carriers, though of less powerful types, and not armed for attacks on armored ships. The ships themselves, though slow and almost unarmed, in the confusion of battle and aided by weather and smokescreens mostly survived. Their aircraft, though not appropriately armed, sank and damaged several ships, and did much to confuse and harass the Center Force.

The breakdown in Japanese communications left Kurita unaware of the opportunity that Ozawa's decoy plan had offered him. Kurita's mishandling of his forces during the surface engagement further compounded his losses. Despite Halsey's failure to protect the northern flank of the Seventh Fleet, Taffy 3 and assisting aircraft turned back the most powerful surface fleet Japan had sent to sea since the Battle of Midway. Domination of the skies, prudent and timely maneuvers by the U.S. ships, tactical errors by the Japanese admiral, and superior American radar technology, gunnery and seamanship all contributed to this outcome.

In addition, accurate anti-aircraft fire and air cover over US ships shot down several kamikazes, while the center force, lacking air cover, was vulnerable to air attack and was forced to constantly conduct evasive maneuvers while under air attack. Lastly, the attacking Japanese force initially used armor-piercing shells which were largely ineffective against unarmored ships as they passed right through without exploding; Such munition can be ineffective against thinly armored nautical targets such as destroyers or destroyer escorts.

Kurita and his officers knew they could not conduct a high speed chase after the small force without a fleet oiler, and it contradicted with the original plan orders, which prioritized the landing forces over anything else. Kurita then received a cryptic message ordering him north, and in a unanimous decision with his officers ordered his force northwards towards Ozawa's force, where he thought a surface battle between the northern force and an American fleet was about to take place. 

Clifton Sprague's task unit lost two escort carriers: Gambier Bay, to surface attack and St. Lo, to kamikaze attack. Of the seven screening ships, fewer than half, two destroyers (Hoel and Johnston) and a destroyer escort (Samuel B. Roberts), were lost, as were several aircraft. The other four U.S. destroyers and escorts were damaged. Though it was such a small task unit, over 1,500 Americans died, comparable to the losses suffered at the Allied defeat of the Battle of Savo Island off Guadalcanal, when four cruisers were sunk. It was also comparable to the combined losses of the 543 men and 3 ships at the Battle of the Coral Sea, and 307 men and 2 ships at the Battle of Midway.

On the other side of the balance sheet, the Japanese lost three heavy cruisers, and a fourth limped back to base seriously damaged, having lost its bow. All of Kurita's battleships except Yamato suffered considerable damage, all of the other heavy ships stayed inactive in their bases, and the Japanese Navy, as a whole, had been rendered ineffective for the remainder of the war. Of the six U.S. ships, totaling , lost during Leyte Gulf operations, five were from Taffy 3. The Japanese lost 26 ships, totaling , in Leyte Gulf combat.

Criticism of Halsey

Halsey was criticized for his decision to take TF 34 north in pursuit of Ozawa and for failing to detach it when Kinkaid first appealed for help. A piece of U.S. Navy slang for Halsey's actions is "Bull's Run," a phrase combining Halsey's newspaper nickname "Bull" (in the U.S. Navy, the nickname "Bull" was used primarily by enlisted men, and Halsey's friends and fellow officers called him  "Bill") with an allusion to the Battle of Bull Run in the American Civil War.

In his dispatch after the battle, Halsey gave reasons for his decision as follows:

Halsey also said that he had feared that leaving TF 34 to defend the strait without carrier support would have left it vulnerable to attack from land-based aircraft and leaving one of the fast carrier groups behind to cover the battleships would have significantly reduced the concentration of air power going north to strike Ozawa.

Morison writes in a footnote, "Admiral Lee, however, said after the battle that he would have been only too glad to have been ordered to cover San Bernardino Strait without air cover." If Halsey had been in proper communication with Seventh Fleet, the escort carriers of TF 77 could have provided adequate air cover for TF 34, a much easier matter than it would be for those escort carriers to defend themselves against the onslaught of Kurita's heavy ships.

It may be argued that the fact that Halsey was aboard one of the battleships and "would have had to remain behind" with TF 34 while the bulk of his fleet charged northwards to attack the Japanese carriers may have contributed to that decision. However, it would have been perfectly feasible and logical to have taken one or both of Third Fleet's two fastest battleships, Iowa and New Jersey, with the carriers in the pursuit of Ozawa, while leaving the rest of the Battle Line off San Bernardino Strait. (Indeed, Halsey's original plan for the composition of TF 34 was that it would contain only four, not all six, of the Third Fleet's battleships.) Therefore, to guard San Bernardino Strait with a powerful battleship force would have been compatible with Halsey's personally going north aboard the New Jersey.

It seems likely that Halsey was strongly influenced by his chief of staff, Rear Admiral Robert "Mick" Carney, who was also wholeheartedly in favor of taking all Third Fleet's available forces northwards to attack the Japanese carrier force.

Clifton Sprague, the commander of Task Unit 77.4.3 in the battle off Samar, was later bitterly critical of Halsey's decision and of his failure to inform Kinkaid and the Seventh Fleet clearly that their northern flank was no longer protected:

Regarding Halsey's failure to turn TF 34 southwards when Seventh Fleet's first calls for assistance off Samar were received, Morison writes:

Morison also observes, "The mighty gunfire of the Third Fleet's Battle Line, greater than that of the whole Japanese Navy, was never brought into action except to finish off one or two crippled light ships." Perhaps the most telling comment was made laconically by Vice Admiral Willis Augustus Lee in his action report as the Commander of TF 34: "No battle damage was incurred, nor inflicted on the enemy by vessels while operating as Task Force Thirty-Four."

In his master's thesis submitted at the U.S. Army Command and General Staff College, Lieutenant Commander Kent Coleman argues that the division of command hierarchies of the Third Fleet, under Halsey reporting to Admiral Nimitz, and Seventh Fleet, under Vice Admiral Kinkaid reporting to General MacArthur, was the primary contributor to the near-success of Kurita's attack. Coleman concludes that "the divided U.S. naval chain of command amplified problems in communication and coordination between Halsey and Kinkaid. This divided command was more important in determining the course of the battle than the tactical decision made by Halsey and led to an American disunity of effort that nearly allowed Kurita’s mission to succeed."

Presidential Unit Citation
Taffy 3 was awarded a Presidential Unit Citation:

For extraordinary heroism in action against powerful units of the Japanese Fleet during the Battle off Samar, Philippines, October 25, 1944. ... the gallant ships of the Task Unit waged battle fiercely against the superior speed and fire power of the advancing enemy, ... two of the Unit's valiant destroyers and one destroyer escort charged the battleships point-blank and, expending their last torpedoes in desperate defense of the entire group, went down under the enemy's heavy shells as a climax to two and one half hours of sustained and furious combat. The courageous determination and the superb teamwork of the officers and men who fought the embarked planes and who manned the ships of Task Unit 77.4.3 were instrumental in effecting the retirement of a hostile force threatening our Leyte invasion operations and were in keeping with the highest traditions of the United States Naval Service.

Legacy

When  struck a mine in 1988, her crew touched a plaque commemorating the original crew as they struggled to save the ship.

While the battle is frequently included in historical accounts of the Battle of Leyte Gulf, the duels between the destroyer and destroyer escorts and Yamato and the Japanese force were the subject of a Dogfights television episode, "Death of the Japanese Navy". That episode, as well as a History Channel documentary, was based on The Last Stand of the Tin Can Sailors, written by James D. Hornfischer. There was also an episode of Ultimate Warfare on American Heroes Channel called Courage at Sea.

The survivors formed associations which still meet annually, and raised funds to build memorials in San Diego near the current location of the  Museum, which contains a model of Gambier Bay.

Notes

References

Works cited

Further reading

Reports

Audio/visual media
 Lost Evidence of the Pacific: The Battle of Leyte Gulf. History Channel. TV. Based on book by Hornfischer, James D. (2004). The Last Stand of the Tin Can Sailors.
 Dogfights: Death of the Japanese Navy. History Channel. TV. Based on book, and with interview by Hornfischer, James D. (2004). The Last Stand of the Tin Can Sailors.

External links

 Return to the Philippines: public domain documents from HyperWar Foundation
 Battle Experience: Battle for Leyte Gulf [Cominch Secret Information Bulletin No. 22]
 Task Force 77 Action Report: Battle of Leyte Gulf
 Order of Battle at NavWeaps.com

Samar
Samar
Samar
World War II aerial operations and battles of the Pacific theatre
1944 in the Philippines
Sam
Sam
History of Eastern Samar
Samar